Historias de un arrabal parisino (Stories of a Parisian suburb) is the third novel by the Venezuelan Vicente Ulive-Schnell and was published by Ediciones Idea in Spain. The semi-biographical book is based on two articles that appeared in both the online and print editions of the New York newspaper El Nuevo Cojo Ilustrado in 2004. The novel recounts the adventures of a young Venezuelan student in Paris, and his travels through the city's most distressed neighborhoods, Barbès and Château-Rouge.

This work revealed a new facet in the author's writing: his ability to entertain and make the reader laugh. The text also takes the reader through the doubts and uncertainties experienced by a young man who wants to become a writer but do not have the faintest idea how. Furthermore, it documents, albeit non-intentionally, the experiments with moving images that eventually lead to the writing and production of short film called "Permanence".

The edition published by Ediciones Idea had the support and contribution of Spanish photographer Tarek Ode, who gave one of his works for the cover and who presented the book in the Elder House of Tenerife in the company of the author.

Venezuelan novels
2007 novels
Spanish-language novels
Novels set in Paris